The FIBT World Championships 1961 took place in Lake Placid, New York, United States for the second time after hosting the event previously in 1949.

Two man bobsleigh

Monti won his fifth straight championship in this event, a record that still stands . Zardini won his third straight championship medal in this event with his third different brakeman.

Four man bobsleigh

Medal table

References
2-Man bobsleigh World Champions
4-Man bobsleigh World Champions

IBSF World Championships
International sports competitions hosted by the United States
Sports in Lake Placid, New York
1961 in bobsleigh
Bobsleigh in the United States 
1961 in American sports